The Eastern Mediterranean University (EMU) is a public university in Northern Cyprus. It was established in 1979 under the leadership of Onay Fadıl Demirciler (then Undersecretary of the Ministry of Education) as a higher-education institution of technology for Turkish Cypriots. In 1986, it was converted to a state university. The campus is located within the city of Famagusta.

The university has 141 programs (11 Faculties and 5 Schools) offering undergraduate and postgraduate degrees, as well as a research infrastructure. The languages of instructions are Turkish and English. However, an English Preparatory School is available for students who need to improve their English. The university also offers a variety of sports and social activities.  Academic Programs of EMU include Physical and Social Sciences with research studies via Research Advisory Board.

History and status 

The university's initial establishment was called Institute of Technology, with engineering fields as its founding departments. In 1984, Civil Engineering, Electrical Engineering and Mechanical Engineering programs were extended to four-year programs. In the following year, governments of the Turkish Republic and Turkish Republic of Northern Cyprus mutually agreed on opening a university called "Eastern Mediterranean University". Members of the Turkish Republic Council of Higher Education visited the Institute of Higher Technology with the aim of transforming it into a university.

In 1986, following the TRNC Assembly's approval of the Statute establishing the North Cyprus Education Foundation and Eastern Mediterranean University (18/86), the Institute of Higher Technology was converted into a state university assuming the name of Eastern Mediterranean University. That the same year, the Faculties of Engineering, Arts and Sciences, Business and Economics and School of Computing and Technology were inaugurated. In 1990, the Faculty of Architecture and School of Tourism and Hospitality were opened. The Faculty of Law was established in 1996. The Faculty of Communication was inaugurated in 1997 and Faculty of Education in 1999. The School of Applied Sciences became operation in 2007 and in 2010, the Faculty of Health Sciences and School of Justice were established. With the inauguration of the Pharmacy Faculty in 2011, the number of Faculties offering education reached 9 and schools 4.

University is a full member of the European University Association and the International Association of Universities. The university established its accreditation for Turkish students under the Council of Higher Education and Turkish Cypriot higher education organisation, but retains its independent structure via its non-profit foundation.

Rankings and reputation

The Shanghai Ranking ranked the Eastern Mediterranean University 601-800 among world universities in 2017, 2018 and 2019.
Also, the Shanghai Ranking ranked the Eastern Mediterranean University 801–1000 among world universities in 2020 and 2021.
The Eastern Mediterranean University (EMU) has ranked 1,148 in the ‘7th Annual U.S. News & World Report World's Best Universities Rankings 2021. The EMU has been announced as the world's best 662nd university in the field of Engineering by the U.S. News & World Report in 2021.
In the 2022, the Shanghai Ranking ranked the Eastern Mediterranean University 501–600 among world universities. It is also ranked 501–600 among world universities by the Shanghai Ranking in the 2023. Also, the U.S. News & World Report ranked Eastern Mediterranean University 945 among world universities in 2022. The university is ranked 721 in the field of Engineering by the U.S. News & World Report in 2022. The U.S. News & World Report ranked Eastern Mediterranean University 782 among world universities in 2023.

Degrees
EMU offers undergraduate, Master's and Doctoral programs. The Eastern Mediterranean University Institute of Graduate Studies and Research currently runs 13 Doctoral level, 20 Master's level graduate programs with a thesis requirement, and 5 Master's level graduate programs with a non-thesis requirement.

The university gives scholarships to successful athletes.

Campus

Library 
The university's library is one of the largest on the island, collection reached more than 120,000 books, and offers free access to hundreds of information databases and sources to the users.

The campus was expanded in the 1990s to include sports and social facilities.

Sports
The campus includes tennis and basketball courts as well as AstroTurf football pitches, next to an outdoor athletics stadium. Another main sports facility is the Lala Mustafa Pasha indoor sports centre, which serves as the venue for major sporting and cultural events.

Social activities
University owns a radio station on 106.5 FM called Radio EMU broadcasting to whole island. It is run by students of the Communications department.

Controversies 

A North Cypriot Newspaper, Cyprus Today, published two articles in 2008, featuring allegations of mobbing and bullying at the school, particularly against foreign faculty.

In the first article, the newspaper quoted the allegations of an ex-faculty member who claimed that he was forced to resign after he was harassed, professionally sabotaged, and the victim of false allegations (of which he was later exonerated after appealing to international organizations). The School administration denied the allegations and stated that the allegations were "Utterly false and that no such thing has occurred and nothing can be substantiated". A spokesman for the Worker's union said they were not aware of that particular faculty member's situation, but had experienced similar problems concerning other faculty members.

In the second article, the newspaper reported about the penalizing of a British Faculty member, who was removed from the position of department chair for undisclosed reasons. The faculty member declined to comment, as did the university administration.

On 9 September 2009, Eastern Mediterranean University's rector was dismissed by the University Senate. The university's board of trusties unanimously ratified the decision on 11 September. No reason was ever given publicly for the dismissal, as the rector was replaced by Prof. Dr. Abdullah Y. Öztoprak. The rector's dismissal was finally declared illegal by the Supreme Administrative Court on 14 July 2010. On 13 March 2011, The Upper Supreme Administrative Court rejected the decision of the lower Supreme Administrative Court and decided that the rector of Eastern Mediterranean University is Abdullah Y. Öztoprak.

Affiliations
The university is a member of the Caucasus University Association.

Notable people
 Buğra Gülsoy - Actor
 Ebru Polat - Singer
 Mehmet Muş - MP in Turkey
 Nancy D. Erbe - Distinguished Fulbright Scholar (visited and taught in 2009)
 Bülent Turan - MP in Turkey

References

External links
EMU Blog

Eastern Mediterranean University
Engineering universities and colleges
Technical universities and colleges in Cyprus
Education in the European Union
Univ.
Educational institutions established in 1979
English as a global language
1979 establishments in Cyprus
Organisations based in Northern Cyprus
Buildings and structures in Famagusta